The 1966 College Football All-America team is composed of college football players who were selected as All-Americans by various organizations that chose College Football All-America Teams in 1966.

The NCAA recognizes six selectors as "official" for the 1966 season.  They are (1) the American Football Coaches Association (AFCA), (2) the Associated Press (AP), (3) the Central Press Association (CP), (4) the Football Writers Association of America (FWAA), (5) the Newspaper Enterprise Association (NEA), and (6) the United Press International (UPI). Four of the six teams (AP, UPI, NEA, and FWAA) were selected by polling of sports writers and/or broadcasters. The Central Press team was selected with input from the captains of the major college teams.  The AFCA team was based on a poll of coaches.  Other notable selectors, though not recognized by the NCAA as official, included Time magazine, The Sporting News (TSN), and the Walter Camp Football Foundation (WCFF).

The undefeated Notre Dame and Michigan State teams finished the season ranked #1 and #2, played to a 10-10 tie in the 1966 Notre Dame vs. Michigan State football game, and dominated the 1966 All-America selections. Notre Dame had six players who received first-team honors: guard Tom Regner (AFCA, AP, CP, NEA, UPI, Time, TSN, WCFF); back Nick Eddy (AFCA, AP, CP, FWAA, NEA, UPI, WCFF); defensive end Alan Page (CP, FWAA, NEA, Time, TSN, WCFF); linebacker Jim Lynch (AFCA, AP, CP, FWAA, NEA, UPI, Time, TSN, WCFF); and defensive tackles Pete Duranko (AFCA, UPI) and Kevin Hardy (Time, TSN). Michigan State had five: defensive end Bubba Smith (AFCA, AP, CP, FWAA, NEA, UPI, Time, TSN, WCFF); offensive end Gene Washington (AFCA, UPI, Time, TSN); running back Clint Jones (AP, CP, NEA, Time, TSN, WCFF); defensive back/linebacker George Webster (AFCA, AP, CP, FWAA, NEA, UPI, Time, TSN, WCFF); and tackle Jerry West (NEA).

Consensus All-Americans
The NCAA recognizes 22 players as "consensus" All-Americans for the 1966 season. The following chart identifies the consensus All-Americans and displays which first-team designations they received.

Offensive selections

Ends 

 Jack Clancy, Michigan (AFCA, AP-1, CP-1, FWAA, NEA-1 [split end], UPI-1, FN, Time, TSN, WCFF)
 Ray Perkins, Alabama (AFCA [flanker], AP-1, CP-2, FWAA, NEA-1 [safety], UPI-2, FN, WCFF)
 Gene Washington, Michigan State (College Football Hall of Fame) (AFCA, NEA-2 [split end], UPI-1, Time, TSN)
 Jim Beirne, Purdue (CP-1)
 Eppie Barney, Iowa (AP-2 [end])
 Larry Gilbert, Texas Tech (AP-2 [end])
 Jim Seymour, Notre Dame (CP-2, NEA-2 [flanker], UPI-2, FN)

Tight ends 

 Austin Denney, Tennessee (NEA-1)
 Cas Banaszek, Northwestern (NEA-2)

Tackles 

 Cecil Dowdy, Alabama (AFCA [guard], AP-1, CP-1, FWAA, NEA-1, UPI-1, WCFF)
 Ron Yary, USC (College and Pro Football Halls of Fame) (AFCA, AP-2, CP-1, FWAA, NEA-2, UPI-1, FN, Time, TSN, WCFF)
 Wayne Mass,  Clemson (AFCA, CP-2, UPI-2)
 Jerry West, Michigan State (NEA-1)
 Jack Calcaterra, Purdue (AP-2, UPI-2)
 Reeve Vannaman, Cornell (CP-2)

Guards 

 Tom Regner, Notre Dame (AFCA, AP-1, CP-1, NEA-1, UPI-1, FN, Time, TSN, WCFF)
 LaVerne Allers, Nebraska (AP-1, CP-1, NEA-2, UPI-1, FN, WCFF)
 Mo Moorman, Texas A&M (FWAA, NEA-2 [tackle], Time, TSN)
 Gary Bugenhagen, Syracuse (AP-1 [tackle], FWAA)
 Bob Hyland, Boston College (CP-2, Time, TSN)
 Edgar Chandler, Georgia (NEA-1, UPI-2)
 Lynn Thornhill, Southern Methodist (AP-2)
 Del Williams, Florida State (AP-2, CP-2, NEA-2, UPI-2)

Centers 

 Jim Breland, Georgia Tech (AFCA, AP-1, CP-1, NEA-1, UPI-1, FN, WCFF)
 Bill Carr, Florida (AP-2, CP-2, Time, TSN)
 Ray Pryor, Ohio State (FWAA, NEA-2)
 Bob Johnson, Tennessee (FN)
 George Goeddeke, Notre Dame (UPI-2)

Quarterbacks 

 Steve Spurrier, Florida (College Football Hall of Fame) (AFCA [tie], AP-1, CP-1, FWAA, NEA-1, UPI-1, FN, Time, TSN, WCFF)
 Bob Griese, Purdue (College and Pro Football Halls of Fame) (AFCA [tie], AP-2, CP-2, NEA-2, UPI-2, FN)
 Gary Beban, UCLA (FN)

Running backs 

 Mel Farr, UCLA (AFCA, AP-1, CP-2, FWAA, NEA-1, UPI-1, FN [halfback], Time, TSN, WCFF)
 Nick Eddy, Notre Dame (AFCA, AP-1, CP-1, FWAA, NEA-1 (FL), UPI-1, FN [halfback], WCFF)
 Clint Jones, Michigan State (AP-1, CP-1, NEA-1, UPI-2, Time, TSN, WCFF)
 Floyd Little, Syracuse (College and Pro Football Halls of Fame) (AFCA, AP-2, CP-2, NEA-2, UPI-1, WCFF)
 Ray McDonald, Idaho (AP-2, NEA-2, UPI-2, Time, TSN)
 Lenny Snow, Georgia Tech (FWAA, UPI-2, FN [halfback])
 Larry Csonka, Syracuse (College and Pro Football Halls of Fame) (CP-1 [fullback], FN [fullback])
 Jim Bohl, New Mexico State (FN [halfback])
 Warren McVea, Houston (FN [halfback])
 Bob Apisa, Michigan State (FN [fullback])
 Larry Conjar, Notre Dame (FN [fullback])
 Garrett Ford, Sr., West Virginia (AP-2)
 Pete Pifer, Oregon State (CP-2 [fullback])

Defensive selections

Defensive ends 

 Bubba Smith, Michigan State (College Football Hall of Fame) (AFCA, AP-1, CP-1, FWAA, NEA-1, UPI-1, FN [end], Time, TSN, WCFF)
 Alan Page, Notre Dame (College and Pro Football Halls of Fame) (AP-2, CP-1, FWAA, NEA-1, UPI-2, FN [end], Time, TSN, WCFF)
 George Foussekis, Virginia Tech (AP-2)
 Sam Harris, Colorado (CP-2, UPI-2)
 Billy Anders, Ohio State (CP-2)
 Dennis Randall, Oklahoma State (NEA-2)
 Ted Hendricks, Miami (College and Pro Football Halls of Fame) (NEA-2)

Defensive tackles 

 Loyd Phillips, Arkansas (College Football Hall of Fame) (AFCA, AP-1, CP-1, FWAA, NEA-1, UPI, FN [tackle], Time, TSN, WCFF)
 Tom Greenlee, Washington (AFCA, AP-1 [defensive end], UPI-1 [defensive end], WCFF)
 Pete Duranko, Notre Dame (AFCA, UPI)
 Dennis Byrd, North Carolina State (College Football Hall of Fame) (AP-2, NEA-1, FWAA)
 George Patton, Georgia (AP-1, CP-1, UPI-2, FN [tackle])
 Kevin Hardy, Notre Dame (AP-2, UPI-2, FN [tackle], Time, TSN)
 Bill Stanfill, Georgia (College Football Hall of Fame) (NEA-2)
 Ed Philpott, Miami (OH) (CP-2, NEA-2)
 Jim Urbanek, Mississippi (CP-2, FN [tackle])

Middle guards 

 Wayne Meylan, Nebraska (College Football Hall of Fame) (AFCA [defensive tackle], AP-1, CP-2 [guard], FWAA, NEA-1, UPI-1, FN [guard], WCFF)
 John LaGrone, SMU (AFCA [middle guard], AP-2, CP-1 [guard], FWAA, NEA-1 [linebacker], UPI-2, WCFF)
 John Richardson, UCLA (CP-1 [guard])
 Granville Liggins, Oklahoma (CP-2 [guard], NEA-2, FN [guard])

Linebackers 

 Jim Lynch, Notre Dame (College Football Hall of Fame) (AFCA, AP-1, CP-1, FWAA, NEA-1, UPI-1, FN, Time, TSN, WCFF)
 Paul Naumoff, Tennessee (AFCA, AP-1, CP-2, FWAA, NEA-2, UPI-1, FN, WCFF)
 Bob Matheson, Duke (AP-1, Time, TSN)
 Townsend Clarke, Army (AP-2, CP-1, NEA-1, UPI-2)
 Charles Thornhill, Michigan State (AP-2, NEA-2, UPI-2)
 Adrian Young, Southern California (AP-2)
 Dwight Lewis, Mississippi State (CP-2)
 Wayne Purdon, Montana State (CP-2)

Defensive backs 

 George Webster, Michigan State (College Football Hall of Fame) (AFCA, AP-1, CP-1 [linebacker], FWAA, NEA-1 [linebacker], UPI-1, FN [linebacker], Time, TSN, WCFF)
 Nate Shaw, USC  (AFCA, AP-2, CP-2, NEA-1, UPI-1, FN, Time, TSN, WCFF)
 Tom Beier, Miami (Fla.)  (AFCA, AP-1, CP-2, NEA-1, UPI-1, FN, WCFF)
 Frank Loria, Virginia Tech (AP-1, FWAA)
 Martine Bercher, Arkansas (AFCA, UPI-1)
 Rick Volk, Michigan (Time, TSN)
 John Charles, Purdue (Time, TSN)
 Henry King, Utah State (NEA-2, Time, TSN)
 Bobby Johns, Alabama (CP-1, UPI-2, FN)
 Wynn Mabry, Dartmouth (CP-1)
 Larry Wachholtz, Nebraska (AP-2, UPI-2)
 Chuck Latourette, Rice (AP-2)
 Bruce Sullivan, Illinois (NEA-2)
 Bobby Bryant, South Carolina (NEA-2 [safety])
 Tom Schoen, Notre Dame (UPI-2)
 Lynn Hughes, Georgia (UPI-2)

Special teams

Kicker 

 Jan Stenerud, Montana State (Pro Football Hall of Fame) (TSN)

Punter 

 Ron Widby, Tennessee (TSN)

Key 
 Bold – Consensus All-American
 -1 – First-team selection
 -2 – Second-team selection
 -3 – Third-team selection

Official selectors
 AFCA = American Football Coaches Association, sponsored by the Eastman Kodak Company
 AP = Associated Press, "based on recommendations of the AP football board of sportswriters and sportscasters"
 CP = Central Press Association, "picked with the aid of the nation's football captains"
 FWAA = Football Writers Association of America
 NEA = Newspaper Enterprise Association, "chosen by consulting scouts, coaches and writers in every part of the country, representing a true cross-section of opinion"
 UPI = United Press International, "selected by the ballots of 267 football writers and broadcasters"

Unofficial selectors
 FN = The Football News, consisting of the 34 best players out of the 25,000 men playing college football that year, as selected by the paper's correspondents and staff members
 Time = Time magazine
 TSN = The Sporting News, consisting of 24 players (11 offense, 11 defense, a punter, and a placekicker) "picked by 24 directors of player personnel of the American and National Football Leagues for the Sporting News"
 WCFF = Walter Camp Football Foundation

See also
 1966 All-Atlantic Coast Conference football team
 1966 All-Big Ten Conference football team
 1966 All-Pacific-8 Conference football team
 1966 All-SEC football team
 1966 All-Southwest Conference football team

References

All-America Team
College Football All-America Teams